A World Aeronautical Chart (WAC) is a type of aeronautical chart used for navigation by pilots of moderate speed aircraft and aircraft at high altitudes. They are at a scale of 1:1,000,000 (about 1 inch = 13.7 nautical miles or 16 statute miles).

These charts are similar to sectional charts, and the symbols are the same.  However, there is less detail at the smaller scale, so it is seldom used for visual flight rules flight at slower speeds or for local flights.  WACs show topographic information, airports and radio navigational aids. They are useful for strategic flight planning, where a view of the entire flight area is useful.

These charts are revised annually, except for several Alaskan charts and the Mexican/Caribbean charts which are revised every 2 years. Australian WAC charts are amended every 3 to 5 years. On June 25, 2015, the USA's Federal Aviation Administration  announced the discontinuation of all WACs covering the USA.

A set of 12 WACs covered the continental United States and 8 others covered Alaska. Canadian airspace is covered by a set of 18 WACs. The 43 Australian WACs are indexed according to a geographic name or a corresponding 4-digit number.

Unlike sectional charts, North American WACs are named according to an international "grid system" having a combination of letters and numbers. For example, WAC CF-16 covered the Pacific Northwest, and E-15 covers the British Columbia area. Letters progress from A at the north pole to U at the southern tip of Argentina. The numbers generally progress from 1 at the Greenwich meridian and increasing to the east, to a maximum of 29, depending upon the number of charts required at that latitude.

See also 
Aeronautical chart conventions (United States)
Operational navigation chart (ONC), which do not show controlled airspace boundaries
International Map of the World, another millionth world map

References

Source: FAA Pilot's Handbook

External links
 World 1:1mil AAF Aeronautical Charts – McMaster University
 World 1:1mil AAF Aeronautical Charts CWHM – McMaster University

Aeronautical charts
Air navigation
World maps